Cody Ceci (born December 21, 1993) is a Canadian professional ice hockey defenceman currently playing for the Edmonton Oilers of the National Hockey League (NHL). He previously played for the Ottawa Senators, Toronto Maple Leafs and Pittsburgh Penguins.

After playing junior-age ice hockey with the Ottawa 67's, Ceci was selected 15th overall in the 2012 NHL Entry Draft by the Ottawa Senators. He made his NHL debut in the 2013–14 season after playing for the Senators' American Hockey League (AHL) affiliate Binghamton Senators.

Early life
Born and raised in Ottawa, Ceci is the son of former Canadian Football League receiver and 1984 Vanier Cup MVP Parri Ceci. He has a younger brother, Cole, who is currently playing with the Oshawa Generals in the OHL. He also has an older sister Chelsea. Cody left Ottawa at the age of 13 to attend Lakefield College School, a private boarding institution just north of Peterborough, Ontario. After being drafted, Ceci joined the Ottawa 67's. While playing with the Ottawa 67's, Ceci attended Carleton University.

Playing career

Junior

With the Ottawa 67's in 2011–12, Ceci finished second in scoring amongst all OHL defenceman with 60 points. So eager was Ottawa Senators' GM Bryan Murray to select Ceci that he contacted three different teams early in the 2012 draft in an effort to move up and take the defenceman before another team could. "I honestly never thought he would be available at 15," said Murray. On August 23, 2012, Ceci signed a three-year entry level contract with the Senators.

On January 8, 2013, in an effort to overtake the London Knights in the OHL's Western Conference, the Owen Sound Attack obtained Ceci from the 67's. Ceci did not have NHL callup rights and was thus able to finish the season in junior. Once the Attack were eliminated, Ceci was called up to finish the season in the AHL with the Binghamton Senators, playing in the team's final three games of the regular season. Paired on defence with team captain Mark Borowiecki, he scored his first professional point in his second game with Binghamton and scored his first professional goal a day later in the season finale.

Professional

Ottawa Senators
In October 2013, Ceci was assigned to the Binghamton Senators after training camp. After a suspension to Senators defenceman Jared Cowen, Ceci was called up to Ottawa in December and played his first game in the NHL on December 12, 2013 in Ottawa against the Buffalo Sabres, a 2–1 win for Ottawa. Two games later, on December 16, 2013 at 3:59 of overtime against goaltender Brian Elliott of the St. Louis Blues, Ceci scored his first NHL goal, to win the game 3–2. He was the first teenager in NHL history to score his first NHL goal in overtime. At the beginning of the 2016–17 season, Ceci signed a two-year, $5.6 million contract extension. In the 2016–17 season he made 2.25 million and in the 2017–18 season he made 3.35 million.

On August 3, 2018, Ceci agreed to a one-year, $4.3 million contract with the Senators after filing for salary arbitration.

Toronto Maple Leafs
On July 1, 2019, Ceci was traded by the Senators, along with Ben Harpur, Aaron Luchuk and a 2020 third-round draft pick to the Toronto Maple Leafs in exchange for Nikita Zaitsev, Connor Brown and Michael Carcone. Ceci soon agreed to sign a one-year, $4.5 million contract extension with the Maple Leafs on July 4, 2019. He scored his first goal as a Toronto Maple Leaf on October 4, 2019, in a 4–1 road win over the Columbus Blue Jackets. However, after suffering an ankle injury in February, the Leafs placed Ceci on injured reserve until March 6, 2020.

Pittsburgh Penguins
On October 17, 2020, Ceci signed as a free agent to a one-year, $1.25 million contract with the Pittsburgh Penguins.

Edmonton Oilers
On July 28, 2021, Ceci signed as a free agent to a four-year, $13 million contract with the Edmonton Oilers. The signing was initiated by the loss of Oilers defenceman Adam Larsson to the Seattle Kraken expansion team, which left a defensive role to be filled by the team. In his first year with the Oilers, he managed 5 goals 23 assists during the regular season. During the team's deep run in the 2022 Stanley Cup playoffs, Ceci notably scored the series-clinching goal in Game 7 of the first round series against the Los Angeles Kings. The Oilers were eliminated in the Western Conference Final by the Colorado Avalanche.

International play
 

On November 18, 2009, Ceci was selected by Hockey Canada to compete in the 2010 World U-17 Hockey Challenge for Team Ontario. After the season concluded, Ceci was one of 15 OHL players invited to attend Canada’s National Men’s Summer Under-18 Team selection camp on June 11, 2010. He would again qualify to compete for Team Canada during the 2011 IIHF World U18 Championship.

On April 11, 2016, Ceci was one of 18 players selected by Hockey Canada to compete on Team Canada at the 2016 World Championships. He won a gold medal with the team in his senior debut.

Career statistics

Regular season and playoffs

International

Awards and honours

References

External links

1993 births
Living people
Binghamton Senators players
Canadian expatriate ice hockey players in the United States
Canadian ice hockey defencemen
Edmonton Oilers players
Ice hockey people from Ottawa
National Hockey League first-round draft picks
Ottawa 67's players
Ottawa Senators draft picks
Ottawa Senators players
Owen Sound Attack players
Pittsburgh Penguins players
Toronto Maple Leafs players